Cactus is a 1986 Australian drama film directed by Paul Cox and starring Isabelle Huppert.

Cast
 Isabelle Huppert as Colo
 Robert Menzies as Robert
 Norman Kaye as Tom
 Monica Maughan as Bea
 Banduk Marika as Banduk
 Sheila Florance as Martha
 Peter Aanensen as George
 Julia Blake as club speaker
 Jean-Pierre Mignon as Jean-Francois
 Ray Marshall as Kevin
 Maurie Fields as Maurie
 Sean Scully as doctor
 Dawn Klingberg as pedestrian
 Kyra Cox as sister
 Tony Llewellyn-Jones as father

Production
The film was inspired by Paul Cox's memory of his mother temporarily going blind when he was a child. He worked on the story for a number of years, then decided he wanted to work with Isabelle Huppert and wrote the script with her in mind. Bob Ellis worked on the script but fought with Cox over the fact it was about a Frenchwoman staying in Australia, and the two men ended their collaboration.

Actors Equity objected to Huppert's importation but this was overruled.

See also
 Isabelle Huppert on screen and stage

Footnotes

References

External links

Cactus at Australian Screen Online
Cactus at Oz Movies

1986 films
1986 drama films
Australian drama films
Films directed by Paul Cox
1980s English-language films